Cheval Noir is a mountain in the French Alps, in the Savoie department. It lies between Moûtiers in the north east and La Chambre in the south west. It is 2832 m high.

The mountain is the namesake for the geologic Cheval Noir unit, an accretionary wedge that formed during the subduction of the Valais ocean (or North Penninic ocean).

References

Mountains of the Alps
Mountains of Savoie